Banaras Hindu University (BHU) (IAST: kāśī hindū viśvavidyālaya IPA: /kaːʃiː hɪnd̪uː ʋɪʃwəʋid̪jaːləj/) is a collegiate, central, and research university located in Varanasi, Uttar Pradesh, India, and founded in 1916. The university incorporated the Central Hindu College, founded by Indian Home Rule-leaguer and Theosophist, Annie Besant in 1898. After Besant and her associates were marginalized, the university was established by Madan Mohan Malaviya with the financial support of the maharaja of Dharbhanga Rameshwar Singh, the maharaja of Benares Prabhu Narayan Singh, and the lawyer Sunder Lal. With over 30,000 students, and 18,000 residing on campus, BHU is the largest residential university in Asia. The university is one of the eight public institutions declared as an Institute of Eminence by the Government of India.

BHU has often been referred by different names throughout the history and present. Some of the English names include Banaras University, Benares Hindu University, and Hindu University.

BHU is organized into six institutes, 14 faculties (streams) and about 140 departments. , the total student enrolment at the university is 30,698 coming from 48 countries. It has over 65 hostels for resident students. Several of its faculties and institutes include Arts, Social Sciences, Commerce, Management Studies, Science, Performing Arts, Law, Agricultural Science, Medical Science, and Environment and Sustainable Development along with departments of Linguistics, Journalism & Mass Communication, among others. The university's engineering institute was designated as an Indian Institute of Technology in June 2012, and henceforth is Indian Institute of Technology (BHU).

Centralised in 1916 through the Banaras Hindu University Act, Banaras Hindu University is India's first central university. BHU celebrated its centenary year in 2015–2016.

History

The Banaras Hindu University was jointly established by Madan Mohan Malaviya, Annie Besant, Maharaja Rameshwar Singh of Darbhanga Raj  and Prabhu Narayan Singh and Aditya Narayan Singh of Narayan dynasty, while the university is the brainchild of Malviya.
At the 21st Conference of the Indian National Congress in Benares in December 1905, Malaviya publicly announced his intent to establish a university in Banaras. Malaviya continued to develop his vision for the university with inputs from other Indian nationalists and educationists. He published his plan in 1911. The focus of his arguments was the prevailing poverty in India and the decline in income of Indians compared to Europeans. The plan called for the focus on technology and science, besides the study of India's religion and culture:

"The millions mired in poverty here can only get rid (of it) when science is used in their interest. Such maximum application of science is only possible when scientific knowledge is available to Indians in their own country."

-- Madan Mohan MalviyaMalaviya's plan evaluated whether to seek government recognition for the university or operate without its control. He decided in favour of the former for various reasons. Malaviya also considered the question of medium of instruction and decided to start with English given the prevalent environment, and gradually add Hindi and other Indian languages. A distinguishing characteristic of Malaviya's vision was the preference for a residential university. All other Indian universities of the period, such as the universities in Bombay, Calcutta, Madras, etc., were affiliating universities which only conducted examinations and awarded degrees to students of their affiliated colleges. Malaviya had supported Annie Besant's cause and in 1903, he had raised 250,000 Rupees in donations to finance the construction of the school's hostel. In 1907 Besant had applied for a royal charter to establish a university. However, there was no response from the British government.

Following the publication of Malviya's plan, Besant met Malviya and in April 1911 they agreed to unite their forces to build the university in Varanasi 

Malaviya soon left his legal practice to focus exclusively on developing the university and his independence activities. On 22 November 1911, he registered the Hindu University Society to gather support and raise funds for building the university. He spent the next four years gathering support and raising funds for the university. Malaviya sought and received early support from the Kashi Naresh Prabhu Narayan Singh and Rameshwar Singh Bahadur of Raj Darbhanga. Thakur Jadunath Singh of Arkha along with other noble houses of United Provinces contributed for the development of the university.

On 22 March 1915, then Education Minister Harcourt Butler introduced the Benares Hindu University Bill in the Imperial Legislative Council.  In his speech, he remarked about the university:The Benares Hindu University Bill was passed on 1 October 1915 and assented by the Viceroy and Governor-General of India on the same day.

BHU was finally established in 1916, the first university in India that was the result of people's efforts. The foundation for the main campus of the university was laid by Lord Hardinge, the then Viceroy of India, on Vasant Panchami 4 February 1916. To promote the university's expansion, Malviya invited eminent guest speakers such as Mahatma Gandhi, Jagadish Chandra Bose, C. V. Raman, Prafulla Chandra Ray, Sam Higginbottom, Patrick Geddes, and Besant to deliver a series of what are now called The University Extension Lectures between 5–8 February 1916. Gandhi's lecture on the occasion was his first public address in India.

The Nizam of Hyderabad and Berar, Mir Osman Ali Khan, also made a donation for the university.

The university's anthem, called Kulgeet, was composed by university professor and eminent scientist Shanti Swarup Bhatnagar.

Campus

Main campus
Banaras Hindu University's main campus is located on the southern edge of Varanasi, near the banks of the river Ganges. The campus layout approximates a semicircle, with intersecting roads laid out along the radii or in arcs. Buildings built in the first half of the 20th century are fine examples of Indo-Gothic architecture.

The campus has over 65 hostels offering residential accommodation for over 12,000 students. On-campus housing is also available to a majority of the full-time faculty.

The Sayaji Rao Gaekwad Library is the main library on campus and houses over 1.3 million volumes as of 2011. Completed in 1941, its construction was financed by Maharaja Sayajirao Gaekwad III of Baroda. In addition to the main library, there are three institute libraries, eight faculty libraries and over 25 departmental libraries available to students and staff.

Sir Sunderlal Hospital on the campus is a teaching hospital for the Institute of Medical Sciences. Established in 1926 with 96 beds, it has since been expanded to over 900 beds and is the largest tertiary referral hospital in the region.

The most prominent landmark is the Shri Vishwanath Mandir, located in the centre of the campus.

Established in 1920, Bharat Kala Bhavan is the university museum of the Banaras Hindu University. It is situated inside the main campus of the university with over 100,000 holdings which include artifacts, paintings, philately, textiles, costumes, etc.

Rajiv Gandhi South Campus 

It hosts the Krishi Vigyan Kendra (Agricultural Science Centre), with focus on research in agricultural techniques, agro-forestry and bio-diversity appropriate to the Vindhya Range region. The South Campus features a lecture complex, library, student hostels and faculty housing, besides administrative offices.

Halls of residence

BHU is a fully residential university with a total of 66 hostels - 41 hostels for male, 21 hostels for female students, and 4 hostels for International students.

Hostels in the university are divided among different faculties, institutes, campuses, and colleges catering to their specific demands. Out of the four separate hostels for international students, two are for boys and the other two for girls.

Hostels of the university are named after several historically important figures such as Raja Baldev Das Jugal Kishore Birla, Lal Bahadur Shastri, Rani Laxmibai and M. Visvesvaraya. Some hostels are named after important rivers of India; 'Triveni' for instance was initially a cluster of three girls' hostels named after rivers Ganga, Yamuna, and Sarasvati; thereby the cluster being called after Triveni Sangam. Later, hostels named after river Godavari and Kaveri were also added to the 'Triveni' block.

BHU also provides on-campus residence to a substantial number of teaching and non-teaching staff. There are 654 quarters for teaching staff, 688 quarters for non-teaching staff.

Organisation and administration

Governance

The President of India (as of December 2022, Droupadi Murmu) is the visitor of the Banaras Hindu University. The university's formal head is the chancellor (as of December 2022, Giridhar Malviya), though this is a titular figure, and is not involved with the day-to-day running of the university. The chancellor is elected by the members of the University Court. The university's chief executive is the Vice-chancellor (as of December 2022, Sudhir K. Jain), appointed by the President of India on the recommendations of Ministry of Education which, in turn, is based on an open application process. All permanent administrative offices of the university are located in the Central Office.

The university is governed as per the procedures laid out in the Banaras Hindu University Act of 1915, and statutes of the university. The Executive Council is the supreme executive governing body of the university and exercises all the powers on management and administration of the revenue, property, and administrative affairs of the university. The University Court is the supreme advisory body to the Visitor for all matters not otherwise provided for by the Banaras Hindu University Act, and the statutes. The Academic Council is the highest academic body of the university and is responsible for the maintenance of standards of instruction, education and examination within the university. It has the right to advise the Executive Council on all academic matters. The Finance Committee is responsible for recommending financial policies, goals, and budgets.

The BHU Act has clearly laid out procedure and functions of different administrative bodies of the university. All officers of the university draw their power and responsibilities from the BHU Act of 1915, and statues of the university.

University Temple 
The university has a university temple called Shri Vishwanath Mandir also known as Vishwanath Temple located in the center of the campus, primarily dedicated to Lord Shiva along with 8 other temples inside the main temple structure.

International Centre 
BHU established International Centre, a university department in 2004 to handle all international academic affairs such as foreign students' applications, international collaboration, international alumni outreach.

University Museum 

The University Museum, Bharat Kala Bhavan, is an art and archaeological museum on the campus. Established in January 1920, its first chairman was Nobel laureate Rabindranath Tagore, with his nephew Abanindranath Tagore as the vice-chairman. The museum was expanded and gained prominence with the efforts of Rai Krishnadasa. The museum is best known for its collection of Indian paintings, but also includes archaeological artefacts, textiles and costumes, Indian philately as well as literary and archival materials. The Alice Boner Gallery was also set up at Bharat Kala Bhavan with the assistance of the Alice Boner Foundation in 1989 to mark the birth centenary of Alice Boner.

Banaras Hindu University Press 

Established in 1936 with initial funding from Seth Jugal Kishore Birla, formally the Banaras Hindu University Press and Publication Cell, is the university press of BHU. It comprises two entities, namely BHU Press, and the Publication Cell. While the BHU press publishes books, and journals of the university, the Publication Cell looks after the sales aspect. The BHU Press also publishes Vishwa Panchang prepared by the Faculty of Sanskrit Vidya Dharma Vigyan.

Academics 
Academic entities in the Banaras Hindu University are divided in several types of units with varying independence and budget. Institutes are a cluster of one or more faculties; faculties are a cluster of one or more departments, departments are specifically dedicated to one subject such as political science, or mathematics, or pottery. The university also has special chairs, inter-disciplinary schools, and special centres.

Institutes

Banaras Hindu University maintains six institutes:

The Indian Institute of Technology Banaras Hindu University (IIT-BHU) has its roots in the Institute of Technology, Banaras Hindu University (IT-BHU). Upon receiving a proposal from the MHRD to convert IT-BHU into an Indian Institutes of Technology, the university's Executive Council approved the change in 2012. Today the IIT-BHU functions as an autonomous IIT, with certain powers vested in the BHU. IIT provides courses at UG, PG, and PhD level.

The Institute of Science, originally established as the Faculty of Science and later upgraded, provides education in zoology, botany, biochemistry, computer science, geography, mathematics, physics, geology, geophysics , chemistry, statistics. The Institute also publishes the double-blind peer reviewed Journal of Scientific Research.

Established in 1931 as the Institute of Agricultural Research, the Institute of Agricultural Sciences is one of the premier institutes of agricultural sciences in India. The institute comprises 11 departments and four auxiliary units and imparts education through undergraduate, postgraduate, special courses, PhD, and diploma programs.

The Institute of Medical Sciences, comprising three faculties and one college, is one of the premier medical institutions in India. The institute provides courses at undergraduate, postgraduate, PhD, and diploma levels. It also has the Sir Sunderlal Hospital, and a Trauma centre and Super Speciality Hospital

The Institute of Environment & Sustainable Development (IESD), which aims to develop and advance the knowledge of technology and processes for sustainable development, was started in 2010. The institute was established in accordance with the United Nations Decade of Education for Sustainable Development goal to contribute significantly to the development of appropriate knowledge and competences in the area of sustainable development.

Starting as the Department of Management Studies, which was upgraded to Faculty of Management Studies in 1984, IMSt-BHU was finally upgraded into an institute in 2015. The Institute of Management Studies is the business school of Banaras Hindu University.  Among the earliest management schools in India, the institute imparts education at postgraduate and doctoral levels. Alok Kumar Rai, a professor at FMS-BHU is currently the vice-chancellor of the University of Lucknow.

Faculties
There are nine standalone (which are not under any institute or college) faculties at the Banaras Hindu University:

Founded in 1898 as the Central Hindu College, the Faculty of Arts is the oldest faculty of the university. It offers courses in History, Culture, Philosophy, Languages, Literature along with various professional and vocational courses. Due to its nature of age, it is also called the 'Mother faculty' of the university.

Established in 1940 as the Department of Commerce, the Faculty of Commerce was fully institutionalized as an independent faculty in 1965. The FoC offers courses at undergraduate, postgraduate, and doctoral levels in commerce, financial management, foreign trade, and risk & insurance.

Established in 1918 as the Teacher's Training College, the Faculty of Education is based out of the Kamachha Complex (outside main campus). The FoE provides B.Ed, B.Ed (Special Visual Impairment), M.Ed and Ph.D in education.

Established in 1922, the Law School offers courses at undergraduate, postgraduate, doctoral, and diploma level in law.

The Faculty of Performing Arts offers undergraduate, postgraduate and doctorate courses in performing arts. It was founded in 1950 and had several renowned and award-winning artists and musicians as faculty members. Faculty of Performing Arts was started by Omkarnath Thakur in 1950. It was initially instituted as a college called "Music and Fine Arts". In 1966, under Govind Malviya and founding principal Omkarnath Thakur, the college was restructured to a faculty, with three departments (Vocal music, Instrumental music and Musicology). The Faculty of Performing Arts claims to have started the first department of Musicology in India headed by musicologist Prem Lata Sharma.

Established in 1918, the Faculty of Sanskrit Vidya Dharma Vijnan (SVDV) offers courses at Shastri (undergraduate), Acharya (postgraduate), Vidyavardhi (doctoral) and diploma levels in Hindu, Jain, and Buddhism practices and philosophies. The Faculty of Visual Arts offers undergraduate and postgraduate courses in applied and visual arts. It was founded in 1916. It includes five departments: Painting, Applied arts, Plastic arts, Pottery and Ceramics, and Textile designing.

Faculty of Social Sciences (FSS) 
The Faculty of Social Sciences offers undergraduate and postgraduate courses in Social science. It was bifurcated from the Faculty of Arts in 1971. It includes the departments of Economics, History, Political Science, Psychology and Sociology.

Other than the departments, there are five centres which carry on the studies in various fields, namely the Centre for the Study of Nepal, Centre for Women's Study and Development, Centre for Integrated Rural Development, Centre for the Study of Social Exclusion and Inclusion Policy and the Malviya Centre for Peace Research. and Special Courses like Master of Personnel Management and Industrial Relations (MPMIR) 

The faculty holds three chairs, the currently vacant Babu Jagjivan Ram Chair for Social Research, commemorating Jagjivan Ram and his contributions, the Dr. B. R. Ambedkar Chair for Nationalism & National Integration established in 2016 and the Pt. Deendayal Upadhyay Chair, established in 2017.

Currently, Arvind Kumar Joshi is the Dean of Faculty of Social Sciences. Koushal Kishor Mishra has been formerly dean here, several professors are at administrative positions likewise: Professor Sanjay Srivastava as the Member of BHU Court, and Professor Ram Pravesh Pathak (Former Dean) as Chairman of Student Grievance Cell.

In 2021, the Faculty of Social Sciences started a postgraduate course M.A. in Kashi Studies, specializing in the political, religious, and social history of the ancient holy city.

Colleges and schools

Colleges
Four colleges in Varanasi are admitted to the privileges of the Banaras Hindu University.

The DAV Post Graduate College is a public, co-ed, research college admitted to the privileges of Banaras Hindu University, which was established in 1938. There are three public women's colleges: Arya Mahila Post Graduate College, established in 1956; Vasanta College for Women, which was established in 1913 by Annie Besant; and Vasant Kanya Mahavidyalaya, established in 1954.

Schools
Three schools in Varanasi are run by the Banaras Hindu University School Board:
 Ranveer Sanskrit Vidyalaya,
 Central Hindu Boys School 
 Central Hindu Girls School
Kendriya Vidyalaya BHU situated inside the university campus is an autonomous body under the Ministry of Education, run by the Kendriya Vidyalya Sangathan.

Inter-disciplinary schools

School of Biotechnology

The School of Biotechnology (SBT) is a center for postgraduate teaching and research under the aegis of Institute of Science of the BHU. It was established in 1986 with funding from the Department of Biotechnology, of the Ministry of Science and Technology, Government of India. It offers MSc and PhD programmes in Biotechnology.

The interdisciplinary program involves the partnership between the Institute of Science, the Institute of Medical Sciences and the Indian Institute of Technology at BHU. Notable faculty include Arvind Mohan Kayastha.

DBT-BHU Interdisciplinary School of Life Sciences
The Interdisciplinary School of Life Sciences (ISLS) is a joint initiative of the Department of Biotechnology (DBT), Government of India and the BHU. It was established with a grant of INR 238.9 million from the DBT.

Research centres
Apart from specialised centres directly funded by DBT, DST, ICAR and ISRO, a large number of departments under the Institutes of Sciences, Engineering & Technology and Faculty of Social Sciences receive funding from the DST Fund for Improvement of Science & Technology Infrastructure (FIST) and the University Grants Commission (UGC) Special Assistance Programme (SAP). UGC SAP provides funds under its Centre of Advanced Study (CAS), Department of Special Assistance (DSA) and Departmental Research Support (DRS) programmes.

The Centre for Genetic Disorders was established in 2008. The centre is a result of efforts of Rajiva Raman and his team who was granted a DBT-programme support in 2006 (2006-2011). This centre is involved in genetic diagnosis and counselling of cases referred from BHU hospital. The centre is engaged in research on various genetic disorders. It offers a one-year PG diploma course on Chromosomal, Genetic and Molecular Diagnostics. It also offers Ph.D. programmes. The Centre for Interdisciplinary Mathematical Sciences (CIMS) focuses on research and education in mathematics, modelling and statistics. It was established under the management of the Faculty of Science, with support from the Department of Science and Technology (DST). The centre imparts post-graduate education and research with participation from the Department of Mathematics, Department of Statistics and Department of Computer Science of the Institute of Science and the Department of Applied Mathematics of the IIT-BHU. It regularly organises training programmes, workshops, seminars, and conferences.

The Centre of Food Science & Technology (CFST) is an inter-disciplinary research centre with collaboration between the Institute of Agricultural Sciences and the Indian Institute of Technology (BHU) focusing on food processing technology. The Center for Environmental Science and Technology (CEST) is an interdisciplinary university research centre at the Faculty of Science. The CEST conducts three-year M.Sc.(Tech) and Ph.D programmes in Environmental Science & Technology. The centre also works to coordinate environmental programmes of the university

Established by the executive council of the university under the Government of India's Namami Gange Mission, the Malaviya Research Centre for Ganga, River Development & Water Resource Management is dedicated to the study of pollution of the Ganges. The centre focuses on the study of river basin ecology, hydrology and pollution management, technology development, socio-economic and culture, and data management. The centre provides training called Ganga Mitra in pursuance of its objectives on various subjects. Established in 1991, the Malviya Centre for Ethics and Values aims to promote ethics and human values in higher education. The centre provides two-year diploma courses on human values and ethics. The centre has been tasked as the nodal agency for developing and monitoring courses on human values and ethics in all central universities.

Other research centres 

Other research centres of the university include:
 Center for Nanotechnology
 Hydrogen Energy Center
 UGC Advanced Immunodiagnostic Training and Research Center
 Centre for Experimental Medicine and Surgery
 Center for Women's Studies and Development
 Center for the Study of Nepal
 Malviya Center for Peace Research
 Center for Rural Integrated Development
 Centre for Study of Social Exclusion and Inclusive Policy

Special centres

Design Innovation Centre 
Funded by Department of Higher Education, MHRD, and established in 2015, the Design Innovation Centre(DIC) is a collaboration between IIT-BHU and BHU. The DIC focuses on providing a platform to the students and faculties of the university in order to foster innovation and creative problem solving. The centre also serves Indian Institute of Information Technology, Allahabad, Motilal Nehru National Institute of Technology Allahabad, and the University of Allahabad.

BioNest-BHU 
Established in 2020 as the InnoResTech Foundation-BHU (called BioNest-BHU) by funding from the Biotechnology Industry Research Assistance Council, BioNest-BHU aims to promote startup and entrepreneurship in sciences, biotechnology, healthcare, agritech, food technology, etc. composed of expert faculty members from IMS-BHU, IAS-BHU, and ISc-BHU.

Admissions

Starting academic year 2022, the university has confirmed shifting towards the All-India Common University Entrance Test (CUET) for admission to several undergraduate and postgraduate courses, which shall replace the Banaras Hindu University Undergraduate Entrance Test (BHU-UET) and Banaras Hindu University Postgraduate Entrance Test (BHU-PET)  exams. Admissions are done according to coursewise eligibility criteria set by the university, merit in the entrance tests, and as per reservation policy of the Government of India.

Admissions to undergraduate programs of IIT-BHU are only through JEE Advanced, similarly, admissions to programs of IMS-BHU are only through NEET, and admissions to FMS-BHU is through a mix of Common Admission Test and personal interview, etc.

Admissions for PhD are done on the basis of either qualification of National Eligibility Test (NET) by the candidates, or through the scores of Banaras Hindu University Research Entrance Test (BHU-RET). Admissions in Institute of Medical Sciences, Banaras Hindu University are done through PMT exam. Starting 2021, the UET & PET exams have been conducted by the National Testing Agency.

Admissions to the Banaras Hindu University are highly competitive and tough with more than 50 applicants for one seat. BHU attracts a substantial number of international students. The university has a separate admission pipeline for international students. Applications from international students wishing to continue their education at BHU are invited directly to the university International Centre.

Admissions to the diploma and Special Courses of Study (SCS) are conducted through varying processes depending on the faculty, directly by the university.

Banaras Hindu University Entrance Tests 
After opting for CUET exam for undergraduate and postgraduate courses, the Banaras Hindu University now only conducts the Banaras Hindu University Research Entrance Test (BHU-RET) for admission to the PhD courses.

Until 2021, Banaras Hindu University has used to conduct national level BHU-UET for undergraduate courses, and BHU-PET, for postgraduate courses, usually during May–June for admission for which registrations begun on Vasant Panchmi i.e., university foundation day, for over 24 undergraduate and over 100 postgraduate courses. The UET & PET exams were held for 5166 seats in online and offline mode in subject-wise papers. The total exam duration was two hours with multiple-choice questions. Total marks varied with the exam.

The entire admission process is conducted by the Controller of Examinations.

Rankings

Internationally, BHU was ranked 601–800 in the world by the Times Higher Education World University Rankings of 2022 and 153 in Asia in 2022.

In India, the 2022 National Institutional Ranking Framework (NIRF) ranked BHU sixth among universities  and eleventh overall.  In NIRF 2022 rankings, BHU ranked fifth in medical, 20 in law, and 50 in management.

The university was ranked seventh among universities in India by Outlook India in 2020.

Its engineering institute, IIT-BHU, was ranked thirteenth by the NIRF Engineering ranking for 2021. In 2019, IIT-BHU was ranked ninth among engineering colleges in India by The Week.

The Faculty of Law, Banaras Hindu University was ranked fifth in India by Outlook India in 2019 and seventh in India by The Week.

The Institute of Medical Sciences, Banaras Hindu University was ranked fifth among medical colleges in India in 2022 by NIRF. It was ranked seventh among medical colleges in India in 2020 by India Today, sixth by The Week  and eighth by Outlook India.

Library

The Banaras Hindu University Library system was established from a collection donated by P.K. Telang in the memory of his father Justice Kashinath Trimbak Telang in 1917. The collection was housed in the Telang Hall of the Central Hindu College, Kamachha. In 1921, the library was moved to the Central Hall of the Arts College (now the Faculty of Arts).

The present Central Library of BHU was established with a donation from Maharaja Sayajirao Gaekwad III of Baroda. Upon his return from the First round Table Conference, Gaekwad wanted a library built on the pattern of the British Library and its reading room, which was then located in the British Museum. On Malviya's suggestion, he made the donation to build the library on the BHU campus.

The Gaekwad Library is a designated Manuscript Conservation Centre (MCC) of the National Mission for Manuscripts, established in 2003.

By 1931, the library had built a collection of around 60,000 volumes. The trend of donation of personal and family collection to the library continued as late as the 1940s with the result that it has unique pieces of rarities of books and journals dating back to the 18th century.

As of 2011, the BHU Library System consisted of the Central Library and 3 Institute Libraries, 8 Faculty Libraries and over 25 Departmental Libraries, with a collection of at least 1.3 million volumes. The digital library is available to students and staff and provides online access to thousands of journals, besides access to large collections of online resources through the National Informatics Centre's DELNET and UGC's INFLIBNET.

Student life

Festivals and traditions

The Banaras Hindu University observes Saraswati puja day (also known as Vasant Panchami) as its foundation day. Goddess Saraswati is the Hindu goddess of knowledge, music, arts, wisdom and nature. She is also the revered mascot of the university, and is a part of the university seal.

There is an intra-university fest, Spandan, where students represent their faculty/institute in various art competitions such as literature (essay-writing, poems, debates), painting, sketches, vocal music, dancing, singing, drama, and mimicry. It is held every year after Vasant Panchami in the month of February or March. Apart from Spandan, each faculty and institute have their own in-house annual festivals, for instance, Aakanksha is the annual festival of Institute of Science, Banaras Hindu University.

The university anthem, Banaras Hindu University Kulgeet, is sung in chorus before the convocation or any other official event begins.

Convocation Dress 

Academic costume is mandatory for university convocation. The university's academic costume is White Saree with red border, and red blouse for females; and White Kurta with Dhoti or Pyjama for male students. Both academic costumes include Safa and Uttariya. BHU was the first prominent university in India to ditch Western convocation dress for Indian traditional convocation dress, which led to students at other universities demanding the same, and eventually other universities following suit.

Clubs and societies 

BHU has university level Mountaineering Centre, and University Sports Board.  Other interest-specific clubs and societies exist at faculty, institute, and college level, like FSS Connect, which is a consortium of all societies and clubs at the Faculty of Social Sciences. In 2022 BHU Connect was introduced, which is a platform that acts as a consortium for different institutes' clubs and societies, as well as act as an umbrella for students run unit to manage clubs, events and ensure help to aspirants and freshers at the Banaras Hindu University.

Awards and medals
Medals and prizes are awarded at faculty, as well as university level. Each faculty and institute have several in-house awards and medals. Some of the university level medals include:

 The BHU Chancellor's Medal is given to the student securing highest CGPA in the university.
The BHU Medal is given to students who secure the first position in their respective courses (e.g. B.Com.).
Late Maharaja Vibhuti Narain Singh Gold Medal is given to the student securing the highest CGPA in the university.
Ex-President of India Dr. Shanker Dayal Sharma Gold Medal is awarded to the student exhibiting best character, academic excellence, outstanding co-curricular, extra-curricular, and social services in the university.
Bhagwandas Thakurdas Chandwani Gold Medal is given to the student standing first in MBBS at the IMS-BHU.
The Wagle Gold Medal is given to the student standing first in M.A. Economics.

Student unions and protests 

Banaras Hindu University does not have an active political student union, but an administrative student council called the Banaras Hindu University Students Council to represent and safeguard the interests of the students.

Despite no elections, student wings of major political parties have an active presence on the campus.

Organized and unorganized protests are held often in the campus due to the vast majority of students. The most prominent protest in the last few years have been the Banaras Hindu University women's rights protest.

Gallery of notable alumni and faculty

Two former Presidents of India, Sarvepalli Radhakrishnan and A. P. J. Abdul Kalam have worked and taught at the university. Other famous administrators include Sunder Lal, K. L. Shrimali, and Moti Lal Dhar.
Alumni include:

See also

List of universities in India
List of educational institutions in Varanasi

References

Further reading

External links

 

 
Institutes of Eminence
Hindu universities and colleges
Central universities in Uttar Pradesh
Universities and colleges in Varanasi
Educational institutions established in 1916
1916 establishments in India
Madan Mohan Malaviya